Chaerocina is a genus of moths in the family Sphingidae. The genus was erected by Walter Rothschild and Karl Jordan in 1903.

Species
Chaerocina dohertyi Rothschild & Jordan 1903
Chaerocina ellisoni  Hayes 1963
Chaerocina jordani Berio 1938
Chaerocina livingstonensis Darge, 2006
Chaerocina mbiziensis Darge & Basquin, 2008
Chaerocina meridionalis Carcasson, 1968
Chaerocina nyikiana Darge & Basquin, 2008
Chaerocina usambarensis Darge & Basquin, 2008
Chaerocina zomba Darge, 2006

References

 
Macroglossini
Moth genera
Taxa named by Walter Rothschild
Taxa named by Karl Jordan